Larn may refer to:

 Larn (video game), a 1986 roguelike computer game
 Richard Larn, British author and shipwreck expert

See also 
 Larne, a town in Northern Ireland